The radio programming in Trinidad and Tobago caters to a diverse ethnic demographic.  The genesis of radio broadcasting in Trinidad and Tobago began in 1925 with British Rediffiusion via a wired relay network. During World War II, the US Armed Forces Radio Service network – WVDI began broadcasting in May 1943 from Fort Reid, Chaguaramas. At that time, WVDI mainly serviced the armed forces throughout the Caribbean.

British Rediffusion now Rediffusion (Trinidad) Limited created the Trinidad Broadcasting Company in 1946 which launched Radio Trinidad 730 AM in 1947. On October 13, 1957, Radio Guardian 610 AM was launched with the state acquiring the station and renaming it the National Broadcasting Service or NBS 610 Action Radio on November 1, 1969. NBS went on to launch Radio 100 FM on October 6, 1972, being the first station to broadcast on the FM signal. On March 14, 1976, the Trinidad Broadcasting Company launched 95.1 FM, the first privately owned FM station. On January 1, 1991, Radio 105.1 FM became the first station to broadcast local and Caribbean content. In 1992, Radio 97.1 FM became the first station to broadcast pure Adult Contemporary. On July 5, 1993, Radio 103.1 FM became the first station to broadcast the East-Indian format. On December 16, 1993, Radio 96.1FM became the first station to broadcast the Urban Caribbean, R&B and Hip-Hop format. In 1997, Radio 102.1 FM became the first station to broadcast the "Talk Radio" format.

The stations below cover both the AM and FM broadcast bands. Where possible, nicknames of stations have been given alongside the frequencies.

AM stations 
The last AM Station, Radio Trinidad 730AM, ceased broadcasting on April 5, 2015 and rebranded as Sky 99.5 on the FM band.

FM Stations

HD Radio Stations
 Slam 100.5
 Star 947

Defunct

Radio Trinidad - Inspirational Radio 730 AM (Golden Network)
 Voice of Rediffusion (Silver Network)
 Radio 610AM (Radio Guardian)
 Love 94.1FM Heart And Soul (Gospel Station)
98.9 YES FM (Formerly Radi-YO)
 WMJX Radio 100.5FM Smooth Jazz
 Ebony Radio 104.1FM 
 Radio Prime 106.1FM
 WIN Radio 101.1FM 
(101.1FM has been returned on the radio station since 25th. January, 2023)
 Power 102.1FM
 Aakash Vani 106.5

Other Links
Communications in Trinidad and Tobago
Trinidad and Tobago Amateur Radio Society

References

Telecommunications Authority of Trinidad and Tobago (TATT) - List of radio licenses issued by the Government of Trinidad and Tobago
 - Trinidad and Tobago Guardian 2018-02-17

 
Trin